Stücke. Mülheimer Theatertage NRW is a theatre festival in Mülheim, North Rhine-Westphalia, Germany. The Mülheimer Dramatikerpreis is awarded at this festival.

Weblinks 
 
 Kinderstücke

Theatre festivals in Germany